Richard Nelson Swett (born May 1, 1957) is an American politician from the U.S. state of New Hampshire who served as the U.S. representative for New Hampshire's 2nd congressional district from 1991 to 1995. He also served as the U.S. Ambassador to Denmark from 1998 to 2001.

Early life, education and career
Swett was born in Bryn Mawr, Pennsylvania and moved to New Hampshire with his family as a child. He attended Yale University and then became an architect in San Francisco.

Political career

Swett became active in the Democratic Party and eventually began a political career. He was elected to the United States House of Representatives in November 1990 but was defeated at the election in November 1994.

In the run up to Swett's 1990 campaign, former Governor of New Hampshire Meldrim Thomson, Jr. complained unsuccessfully that listing him on the ballot as "Dick Swett" would be unlawfully misleading, since he was listed as "Lantos-Swett" in the telephone book, voter registration, deed to real property, and business.

Mitt Romney donated $250 to his 1992 campaign. They were fellow Mormons with homes on Lake Winnipesaukee.

In 1994, Swett voted for a bill to ban assault weapons that narrowly passed by two votes in the United States House of Representatives. His stand resulted in numerous threats against his life.

In 1996, Swett ran as a Democratic Party candidate for the Class 2 seat in the United States Senate from New Hampshire, against incumbent Republican Bob Smith, but was narrowly defeated. Smith had established himself as the most conservative Senator from the Northeast, and Bill Clinton's coattails nearly caused his defeat. On the night of the election many American media networks incorrectly projected that Swett had won.

In 1998, Bill Clinton appointed Swett to be United States Ambassador to Denmark. He served in that position until 2001, and then moved back to New Hampshire. Swett and Larry Coben wrote the national energy policy for Senator Joseph Lieberman's 2004 presidential campaign.

Swett returned to the field of architecture, assuming the position of Managing Principal for the Washington office of Leo A. Daly before becoming co-founder and CEO of Climate Prosperity Enterprise Solutions.

Swett is a member of the ReFormers Caucus of Issue One.

On August 12, 2019, Swett endorsed Joe Biden for President.

Personal life 
Swett is a member of the Church of Jesus Christ of Latter-day Saints (LDS Church). In 1980, he married Katrina Lantos, daughter of Congressman Tom Lantos and unsuccessful congressional candidate, who had previously converted to the LDS Church while a student at Yale.
They have seven children.

Publications

References

External links
Swett Associates
Richard N. Swett at APCO Worldwide
Richard Swett, Consulting Principal at the Greenway firm
 

Ambassador Richard M. Swett, FAIA at Sepsis Alliance

1957 births
Living people
Latter Day Saints from New Hampshire
Ambassadors of the United States to Denmark
Yale University alumni
Clinton administration personnel
People from Bryn Mawr, Pennsylvania
Architects from New Hampshire
Democratic Party members of the United States House of Representatives from New Hampshire
People from Bow, New Hampshire
Candidates in the 1996 United States elections
Members of Congress who became lobbyists